Oscar Drouin (September 29, 1890 – July 16, 1953) was a politician in Quebec, Canada.

Background

He was born on September 29, 1890 in Quebec City.

Member of the legislature

Drouin won a by-election in 1928 and became the Liberal Member of the Legislative Assembly of Quebec for the district of Québec-Est. He was re-elected in the 1931 general election.

He joined the newly formed Action libérale nationale (ALN) in 1934 and was re-elected as a candidate of that party in the 1935 election.

After the ALN merged with the Conservative Party to form the Union Nationale, Drouin became Maurice Duplessis's campaign manager. He won re-election in the 1936 election and Duplessis became Premier.

Mayoral candidate

Drouin was a mayoral candidate in Quebec City in 1934. He was defeated by Joseph-Ernest Grégoire.

Member of the Cabinet

Drouin was appointed to the Cabinet. He became the Minister of Lands and Forests, but resigned in 1937. He and colleagues René Chaloult, Joseph-Ernest Grégoire, Philippe Hamel and Adolphe Marcoux left the Union Nationale.  Drouin eventually switched Liberal and was re-elected in the 1939 election. He served as Minister of Municipal Affairs in Premier Adélard Godbout's Cabinet.

Federal politics

Drouin did not run for re-election in the 1944 election. He was succeeded by his brother Henri-Paul. He ran as an Independent candidate in the federal district of Matapédia—Matane in the 1945 federal election, but lost.

Death

Drouin died on July 16, 1953.

References

1890 births
1953 deaths
Action libérale nationale MNAs
Independent candidates in the 1945 Canadian federal election
Politicians from Quebec City
Quebec Liberal Party MNAs
Union Nationale (Quebec) MNAs
Université Laval alumni